Swadlincote is a town in the South Derbyshire district of Derbyshire, England.  It contains 24 listed buildings that are recorded in the National Heritage List for England. Of these, two are at Grade II*, the middle of the three grades, and the others are at Grade II, the lowest grade.  The list contains the listed buildings in the town,  and also those in the village of Church Gresley, the wards of Midway, and Newhall and Stanton, and part of the ward of Woodville.  The listed buildings include houses and associated structures, farmhouses, churches, former industrial buildings including bottle kilns, a town hall, a showroom and a school.


Key

Buildings

References

Citations

Sources

 

Lists of listed buildings in Derbyshire
L